Frederick Edwin Beir (September 21, 1927 – June 3, 1980) was an American film and television actor.

Born in Niagara Falls, New York, Beir began his career in 1950, appearing in the television series The Philco Television Playhouse. He also appeared on Broadway in The Terrible Swift Sword (1955). He continued to star or co-star in films and guest-star in television programs.

TV programs on which Beir appeared included The Odd Couple, Kolchak: The Night Stalker, The Andy Griffith Show, Gomer Pyle, U.S.M.C., The Outer Limits, Wagon Train, The Time Tunnel, Mission: Impossible, Mannix, The Six Million Dollar Man, Hawaii Five-O, The Rockford Files, Barnaby Jones and The Twilight Zone. He also starred and co-starred in films, such as The Violators, Assassination, Fort Courageous, Three Dollars of Lead, M.M.M. 83 and The Organization. Beir last appeared in the TV program Lou Grant.

Beir died on June 3, 1980, of cancer in Los Angeles, California, at the age of 52. He was buried in Forest Lawn Memorial Park.

Filmography

Film

Television

References

External links 

Rotten Tomatoes profile

1927 births
1980 deaths
Deaths from cancer in California
People from Niagara Falls, New York
Male actors from New York (state)
American male film actors
American male television actors
20th-century American male actors
Western (genre) television actors
Burials at Forest Lawn Memorial Park (Hollywood Hills)